Neoptochus is a genus of oriental broad-nosed weevils in the beetle family Curculionidae. There is at least one described species in Neoptochus, N. adspersus.

References

Further reading

External links

 

Entiminae
Articles created by Qbugbot